Kostajnica is a town and municipality located in northern Republika Srpska, an entity of Bosnia and Herzegovina. It is situated in the part of the Кrajina region.  As of 2013, it had a population of 5,977 inhabitants, while the town of Kostajnica has a population of 4,047 inhabitants.

The municipality was created from part of the pre-war municipality of Novi Grad. It is located across the Una river from Hrvatska Kostajnica, Croatia.

Etymology

It is considered, that the name of town and municipality of Kostajnica originates from the old Slavic word for sweet chestnut (kostanj). Therefore, the name Kostajnica means the land of chestnuts. Indeed, that is true, because the forests of the Kostajnica municipality grow this particular tree. The name of this settlement was first recorded in 1258. The name Kostajnica is used for  both settlements in the Una valley (Kostajnica-Bosnia and Herzegovina and Hrvatska Kostajnica-Croatia) which surround the Kostajnica castle.

Coat of arms
The coat of arms of the Kostajnica municipality has a form of a medieval shield. In the central part of it is a chestnut with a leaf, that represents the origin of the name of this municipality and of the rare plant, that grows in this area. In the lower part of coat of arms are two leaves that together make a lower frame. Above these two leaves are the river Una (represented with blue colour), on the left side is the bridge, that connects two towns, and on the right side is the medieval Castle. Behind the chestnut and the leaf in the central part are two curves that represent the hill of Balj, where one could find these precious fruits – chestnuts. On the top of the coat of arms is the flag of the Republic of Srpska. Stone blocks represent the will to build and to be strong. Inn the upper central part of the coat of arms there is written 1258 which represents the year when name Kostajnica was first recorded .

Name
During the Bosnian War, when the municipality of Kostajnica was created (it was a part of the Novi Grad municipality), the name of the town was renamed to Srpska Kostajnica (Српска Костајница). After that the name of the town was changed to Bosanska Kostajnica. The final name of the settlement and the municipality is only Kostajnica, according to the decision of the Constitutional Court of Republika Srpska. Meanwhile, residents of the municipality never had an opportunity to decide on the official name.

Settlements
The Kostajnica municipality encompasses a very small area in comparison to the other municipalities in Bosnia and Herzegovina. The municipality has an area of 85,12 km2 and it was formed in the year 1995, therefore it is one of the youngest municipalities in the Republic of Srpska. On the area of the whole municipality there are 11 rural settlements and only one urban settlement (Kostajnica – municipality seat). The settlements that are make up the territory of this municipalities are: Gornja Slabinja, Grdanovac, Gumnjani, Kalenderi, Kostajnica, Mrakodol, Mraovo Polje, Petrinja, Pobrđani, Podoška, Tavija and Zovik.

History
Human settlements in the area of Kostajnica municipality was first recorded from a so-called "Vučedol Culture" period. According to the found remains and preserved documents, it is known that in the era of the ancient Rome, there was trade traffic across the Una River in the territory of the present municipality of Kostajnica. Owing to its location, Kostajnica was already a significant settlement within Roman water supply system. The name Kostajnica was first mentioned as a toponym in the year 1258. During the Middle Ages Kostajnica, as a significant commercial settlement and fortress, was part of the Hungarian Kingdom, i.e. in possession of a nobleman who recognized the Hungarian crown. After 1513. (the victory of the Turks at Dubica), the following masters changed in constant warfare: the Ottoman Empire and the Habsburg monarchy, later the Austro-Hungarian Monarchy. As an integral part of the Kingdom of Illyria, in 1809 the area of Kostajnica came under the rule of Napoleon, and remained until 1814. During the French rule, a wooden bridge was built between the two "Kostajnicas" (two towns that are situated on both banks of the Una river) to facilitate the flow of goods and people. That was then the only bridge on the Una river that served to transport goods from the Middle East to Europe and vice versa. After a brief French administration, Kostajnica again came under Turkish rule in 1814. During the period of Turkish rule, the population of this region raised numerous uprisings. The most famous is Pecija's uprising in 1858, that was led by the hajduks Petar Popović Pecija and Petar Garača. In 1878 Kostajnica again came under Austrian rule and remained until the end of World War I. During the Austro-Hungarian period Kostajnica was first a district, and later a part of the Bosnian-Novi district. During the Kingdom of Yugoslavia Kostajnica was a trade and crafts center. During World War II, the population of this region participated massively in the fight against fascism. This is evidenced by the legendary Balj Company (named after the hill above Kostajnica), which was made up of fighters mostly recruited from the area. In addition to the fallen fighters, as many as 1,848, inhabitants of the municipality lost their lives as victims of the fascist terror war. Their execution sites are Jasenovac, Zemun, Bajića jame and Zečevo Brdo. After World War II, Kostajnica, under the name Bosanska Kostajnica, existed as a municipality within the Bosanski-Novi and later Prijedor district.

Geographical position

The Kostajnica municipality is situated in north-west part of Republic of Srspka and Bosnia and Herzegovina and lies at one of the ends of Republika Srpska territory (Other is Trebinje at the south-east). The area of Kostajnica municipality lies on the right river bank of Una river. North and north-west border represents river Una, which is also the border between Croatia and Bosnia and Herzegovina, south border is border with Novi Grad municipality. The Kostajnica municipality is relatively small municipality, only 85 km2.

The highway of the most importance that traverse this municipality is highway M-14 (Bihać – Bosanska Krupa – Novi Grad – Kostajnica - Kozarska Dubica – Gradiška) and regional highway R-475 (Kostajnica – Prijedor). For this town the border checkpoint between BiH and Croatia has a large importance for the local economy and it is located at the very centre of the city. Through the territory of this municipality runs the railway Zagreb – Banja Luka, namely through the settlement Grdanovac, but there is currently no railway station, nor is one planned. Regional position of Kostajnica offers many opportunities to his municipality, especially the orientation to the West Europe. This municipality is situated about 100 km from Banja Luka, 90 km from Zagreb and 50 from Prijedor. This municipality is integral part of Prijedor region. Historically speaking Kostajnica is also part of Knešpolje (the mini region between towns Kostajnica and Kozarska Dubica), Pounje (valley of the river Una from Novi Grad to Kozarska Dubica) and Krajina (big region of Republika Srpska that incorporates Prijedor and Banja Luka region).

Demographics

Population

Ethnic composition

See also
Municipalities of Republika Srpska

References

External links

 Official website 
 Kostajnica 

Cities and towns in Republika Srpska
Municipalities of Republika Srpska
Bosnia and Herzegovina–Croatia border crossings